Mao Monyvann  (born 11 October 1963) is a Cambodian politician. He belongs to the Cambodia National Rescue Party and was elected to represent Kampong Cham Province in the National Assembly of Cambodia in 2003.

References

1963 births 
Members of the National Assembly (Cambodia)
Candlelight Party politicians
Cambodia National Rescue Party politicians 
Living people